Gemmula sikatunai is a species of sea snail, a marine gastropod mollusk in the family Turridae, the turrids.

Description
The length of the shell varies between 40  m and 80 mm.

Distribution
This marine species occurs off the Philippines; also in the Caribbean Sea.

References

 Olivera B.M. (2005). Evaluation of Philippine Gemmula I. Forms related to G. speciosa and G. kieneri. Science Dilliman. 17(1): 1-14.

External links
 Gastropods.com: Gemmula (Gemmula - speciosa group) sikatunai

sikkatunai
Gastropods described in 2004